Ärnäs (also, Arnäs) is a village adjacent to Kullhån, Älvdalen Municipality, Dalarna County, Sweden.

References

Populated places in Dalarna County